The Rowan County War, located in Rowan County, Kentucky, centered in Morehead, Kentucky, was a feud that took place between 1884 and 1887.  In total, 20 people died and 16 were wounded.

Background

The war has its roots in the Underwood-Holbrook feud, in which John Martin was a lesser member of the Underwood side, and all male Underwoods died in a conflict that took 20 lives.  Martin had worked as a clerk for the county, and owned a store in Morehead.  In 1877, his gambling caused him to lose his store, and charges of falsifying county records cost him his clerk job in an election in 1878.  After this, he rented land from George Underwood, which led him to support the Underwoods in the Underwood-Holbrook feud.

After the feud, Martin began illegal distillery operations.  Being a Republican, he became a political rival of Democrat Floyd Tolliver, also formerly of the Underwood faction, and on election day in August 1884, after a misunderstanding, Tolliver wounded Martin while killing Solomon Bradley, a friend of Martin's.  Just before the matter was to be settled in court in December 1884, Tolliver and Martin met each other while drinking and Martin fired his pistol while still in his coat pocket, killing Tolliver. Tolliver's last words, addressed to some friends, were:

War

Martin was promptly jailed, and then taken to the Clark County jail in Winchester, Kentucky, due to fears for his safety.  This led Tolliver's brother, Craig Tolliver, to kill two cousins of D.B. Logan, an ally of Martin.  Tolliver supporters soon gained control over the county.

Martin was eventually killed after supporters of Tolliver forged a request to transfer Martin back to Morehead, and shot him after boarding the train.  Martin's wife was in another car of the same train, and felt dread after hearing shots fired.  Rushing to the scene, she saw her husband dying.  Martin lived long enough to travel back to Morehead, where he walked to the Powers Hotel, where he died the next day.  Quickly sides were chosen, with Democratic families supporting Craig Tolliver, and Republican families supporting Martin's family.
Craig Tolliver became the town marshal of Morehead, and assumed control of Morehead due to intimidation.  The sheriff of Rowan County, Republican Cook Humphrey, sided with Martin's father, Dr. Ben Martin.  By July 1885, nine out of ten men within the county had taken one side or the other in the new conflict.

Feud violence continued for three years, concluding in the summer of 1887 when a faction led by Hiram and Logan Pigman surrounded and shot Craig Tolliver.  Three others died in a final two-hour shootout involving sixty men.

Aftermath

Three times the state militia was called to quell the violence, including the noted Louisville Legion.  At one point, a state report by General Sam Hill recommended to the governor of Kentucky that Rowan County be dissolved due to the violence.  After a legislative investigation by the Kentucky State Assembly concluded, the townfolk were mortified of their reputation throughout the state. They acted by creating the Morehead Normal School in 1887.  Years later, the school closed in the spring of 1922 when the Kentucky General Assembly established Morehead State University. The incidents of this conflict are chronicled in a ballad titled, alternately, "The Rowan County Crew" and "The Rowan County Feud."

A reconciliation between the Martin and Tolliver families occurred with the marriage of Grace Martin (daughter of Gils Martin) and Frank Tolliver (brother of Craig Tolliver) in 1889.

The Courier-Journal Louisville, Kentucky 04 Apr 1885, Sat

Riotous Rowan  A Full Report of the Deplorable State of Affairs. 
Morehead. Ky. April 3rd, 1885.
 The report of the troubles in Rowan county have not been exaggerated in the essential particulars; the county has been given over to lawlessness, and not even Judge Lynch sits on the bench. Law and order are traditions around Morehead, but the reality is not in existence., When I reached Frankfort this morning, I was fortunate to meet Mr. Z. T. Young, the County Attorney of Rowan. He had been down with some other citizens to implore military protection and was returning from a fruitless mission. The Governor told him that he could not order out the military until the civil authorities had exhausted their powers. The Sheriff had the right to summon every able-bodied man in the county to his assistance, and until this had failed, the state would not interfere. In vain, Mr. Young protested that the Sheriff belonged to one of the factions, and was a prime mover in the disturbance. Gov. Knott said that, unless the commission sent by bim to investigate saw reason to report differently, Rowan county must settle her own trouble, grievous though it might be. Mr. Young had on a new black coat, in the shoulder of which a round hole, the size of a nickel, had been darned. It had been made by a bullet from ambush on March 7, and Mr. youngs's right arm is still hanging useless at his side. When he was informed of my mission he stared in amazement and said, earnestly: "Young man, don't go. It is as much as your life is worth to visit Morehead, for you will be shot down like a dog. " Do you really think there is such danger!" I asked.He made an eloquent gesture with his wounded arm. "I was fired upon from an ambush one evening during a snowstorm," he replied, "and was compelled to leave home to save my life. My son narrowly escaped the bullet of a desperado two days ago, and most of the prominent citizens have also had to fly. Several killings have been made already, and mere may come any minute." Mr. Young is now staying in Mt. Sterling. thirty miles toward Lexington from this place. He said that it was as near to Morehead as safety permitted and that it was the temporary home of a number of other citizens of Rowan. 
ON THE TRAIN with him were Mr. Jas. W. Johnson, Circuit Clerk of Rowan; Dr. "R. L. Raine, proprietor of the Cottage Hotel at Morehead, and Mr. Warren Alderson. the richest man in the county. They had all received warnings and had deemed it prudent to get out of the way, at least for a time; 
Mr. Young- talked freely, eloquently, and enthusiastically. The subject was an interesting one, and he had as an attentive listener. When the train reached Lexington, he got off and while shaking hands with some acquaintances, ran plump upon Judge James Carey and Howard Logan, the leaders of the Republican factions. Logan spoke to him civilly and asked him if he had gone down to have" troops brought up. Mr. Young declined to answer. The other said he asked for information. ' "If that's the case," said Mr. Young, "I did, but I don't think they'll come.". 
Logan then said Young had caused all the trouble in Rowan. Young said he had left expressly to avoid a fuss and had not been to blame. "You are a d—d  liar," was the retort. The lawyer declared that he was not a fighting man and wanted no trouble, retiring to the train in a highly excited condition. He said his life bad been threatened so much that at any time, he might be assassinated. At Mt. Sterling, we were met by the news that everything was quiet, both the Toliver and Cary factions having left Morehead. Dr. Raine concluded to return borne, but the other exiles preferred to remain in the secure retreat of Montgomery county. The news of the truce caused great relief among the neighboring towns. 

THE LITTLE MOUNTAIN VILLAGE seemed almost deserted except at the station. The neat frame bouses were nearly all closed, and the town lay under the frowning sky and drizzling rain as quietly as if it had not been tho seen of pitched battles for two days. The train was met by a number of mountaineers who asked eagerly for the papers and passed jokes about the fight. They regarded the newcomers with some reserve, which wore off after a little. Once started, all talked freely; some expressed the hope that there would be no trouble, and all were anxious to know if the troops were coming. Gen. Castleman and party had just left, but there was not much belief that their visit would accomplish permanent good.

Fued laid out
 It did not take me long to gather the particulars of the feud, though each man. An old citizen, a non-participant, but who begged that his name be withheld, told me the following: The feud dates back, to the Sheriff election last August. Cook Humphrey, Republican, and H. B. Goodman. Democrat, ware candidates. Much drinking was going on, and. in the' afternoon sol Bradley was shot and killed in a quarrel between the two parties. He was not in the row, but was killed by a stray bullet. Ha was a farmer and a married man. Circuit Court commenced in a day or two; John Martin and Floyd Toliver were jointly indicted for the murder. They were released on bail, and a month later, met at the Gault House saloon in this place. A quarrel came up, and Martin killed Toliver on the spot. The murderer was arrested and taken to jail at Winchester . for safe-keeping. A forged order was sent down in a few weeks, and the jailer turned Martin over to Marshal A. M. Bowling, who brought him back,he supposed, to an examining trial. At Farmers'. station, eight miles below here, the train was boarded by a party of : masked men, who shot Martin, is his handcuffs, seven times. He died next morning. They got off as quicly as they came. Nobody appeared to be able to find out who they were, and the February grand jury failed to return a single indictment. The names of Floyd Tollver's Avengers have not been whispered to this day. The trouble had but begun. On the 7th of last month, County Attorney Young was returning from some Magistrate's court a few miles out of Morehead. It was a stormy afternoon, the snow falling fast and furiously. In a hurry to get home, Mr. Young urged his horse to a gallop, but when about three miles out of town a bullet from a Winchester rifle took him in the right arm. He got to town with no further injury, but received warnings which be obeyed by leaving home and staying. Ten days later Deputy Sheriff Stewart Bumgardner was on his way to Hogtown as Elliotsville is pleasantly denominated. The road runs for miles through a deep gorge, on the sides of which, six miles from here, an armed party. Laying in ambush riddled Bumgardner with bullets, making the fourth victim. 
THE LAST KILLING set both factions in a blaze, and they armed openly. Firing began here .Wednesday, then ex-Sheriff Day was missed by someone who was secreted in his house up town. 
Allie, the youngest son of the County Attorney, was treated in the same way, and he too has fled. Taylor and his young brother were next to follow, and both are now at Mt Sterling. Many citizens have followed this example, among them being Robert and James Nickel, James Thompson. Wm. Trumbo, Warren, Alderson, and James W. Johnson. All are accompanied by their families and will stay at Mt. Sterling till peace has been restored. 
I asked the man why Sheriff Humphrey did not stop the fighting. "He can't do it -and besides, he belongs to the Republican. 'faction. He has always had a good reputation, but it seems that some have made him a tool of the leaders. Deputy Bunmgardner, who was killed, Humphrey brought from Elliott county, where he had the reputation of being a fighter. Nobody knew anything about him, and it was thought he was brought here expressly to fight for his crowd. Since his death Humphrey has brought a man named Pearce from Greenup, where he is said to be under indictment for murder. He is the man who shot at Allie Yonng, by direction of the). Sheriff, who was heard by a prominent citizen to give the order. Humphrey would like to resign, but Judge Carey and Howard Logan, the Republican leaders, would not let him give up the fight. When or how it will end only God knows. 
A few days ago, D. M. Dillon, a friend to both parties, was sworn in as Deputy, expressly to make peace. Ha carried messages between the two. Factions, and finally, all but Logan and Carey promised to shake hands and bury the trouble. They said they wouldn't humble themselves to any man, which settled it. Judge Carey keeps the Gault House, and Wednesday his gang fortified it and opened fire on too Tolivers. The fight was kept up, off and on, till yesterday when Jeff Bowling met Pearce and  Sheriff Humphrey on the street. Bowling is dangerous. Young fellow demanded to know if the Sheriff brought Peirce to kill him, and he was told no, but suspected foul play and covered them with his revolver. They retreated, but when they were 100 yards away opened fire, which he returned. Bullets flew around briskly for a few minutes, but no one was hurt. 
A little while afterward, one of the Carey boys came around the other faction but was made to return by Craig Toliver, their leader. It is said further that the two parties are about fifteen in number , all ARMED WITH REPEATING RIFLES and revolvers. The quarrel has been made a political one. However, there is no bitterness between the outside members of the other party. The Republicans, as my informant, could recall their names, were Sheriff Humphrey, Judge James Carey, H. M. Logan, L. D. Logan, Alex  Bradley, Matt Carey, Howard logan and the man Pierce. The Democrats are led by Craig Toliver and Jeff. Bowling. Their followers are Marion tolliver,John C Day and several others. 
A good deal of firing was done last night, and it is reported that one man was hurt. The Carey and Logan faction withdrew. Judge James Carey, Matt Carey and Howard Logan are said to be at Frankfort, while their adherents are probably scouting around the country. The other party is reported as being in- force at Farmers, but at any time, either or both may return.

References

External links
Kentucky Historical Society - Historical markers List
U.S. Forest Service History Society - A History of the Daniel Boone National Forest, Chapter 23
The Man Unafraid, from Stories of Kentucky Feuds, 1923, Harold Wilson Coats
Rowan County War Documentary (9 minute video)

History of Kentucky
Rowan County, Kentucky
1880s in the United States
Feuds in the United States